Ali Hillis (born December 29, 1978) is an American actress who has appeared in television and film, and voices a number of characters in video games. She is best known for her video game work as Dr. Liara T'Soni in the Mass Effect trilogy, Lightning in the Final Fantasy XIII series, and Palutena in Kid Icarus: Uprising.

Biography
Hillis was born in Huntington Beach, California on December 29, 1978. When she was six months old, Hillis and her family moved to Normal, Illinois and at age 3, to Sheboygan Falls, Wisconsin. She moved to Charlotte, North Carolina at age 13 and performed at The Children's Theater. She auditioned for Broadway plays in New York City with TV shows of Felicity (2 episodes in 1999), FreakyLinks, Undressed (2000), Naruto, JAG, Boomtown and Less Than Perfect. Her several film roles are All the Wrong Places, Kiss Kiss Bang Bang, Must Love Dogs, Open Water 2: Adrift, The Ultimate Gift, and The Heartbreak Kid and  the Los Angeles play, A Good Soldier. Her video game roles are Lightning in Final Fantasy XIII, its sequels and Dissidia 012 Final Fantasy, Liara T'Soni in the Mass Effect trilogy, Ariel Hanson in StarCraft II: Wings of Liberty, Karin in the Naruto series, Palutena in Kid Icarus: Uprising and Isabelle "Izzy" Sinclair in Fuse.

In 2012, she starred in a YouTube web series called Fix Me by ModernMom, in which she plays Sydney Lang, a housewife who tries to fix everything around her.

Personal life
Hillis is married to Matt Swartz. The couple have one daughter together.

Filmography

Voice-over roles

Television

Film

Video games

Live-action roles

Television

Film

References

External links

 
 
 

1978 births
Living people
Actresses from Charlotte, North Carolina
Actresses from Huntington Beach, California
Actresses from Los Angeles
American film actresses
American stage actresses
American television actresses
American video game actresses
American voice actresses
East Carolina University alumni
People from Sheboygan Falls, Wisconsin
20th-century American actresses
21st-century American actresses